R. Thavasi was an Indian politician and former Member of the Legislative Assembly of Tamil Nadu. He was elected to the Tamil Nadu legislative assembly as an Anna Dravida Munnetra Kazhagam candidate from Paramakudi constituency in the 1980 election. Sexual misconduct allegations against him were revealed on 2019.

References 

All India Anna Dravida Munnetra Kazhagam politicians
Living people
Year of birth missing (living people)